Naum Kleiman (born 1937; Russian: Нау́м Ихи́льевич Кле́йман) is an historian of cinema, Russian film critic, specialist in Sergei Eisenstein, former manager of the Moscow State Central Cinema Museum, Eisenstein-Centre director, actor and filmmaker. He was a member of the jury at the 43rd Berlin International Film Festival in 1993 and a member of the jury at the Venice Film Festival in 1991. He is a FIPRESCI laureate.

References

External links
 
 Biography
 The Moscow State Central Cinema Museum on fipresci.org
 The Moscow State Central Cinema Museum
 The Moscow State Central Cinema Museum's friends
 Nikita Pavlov » photographer  »   » Naum Kleiman (Cinema Museum, 2003-2004)

1937 births
Living people
European Film Awards winners (people)
Russian film critics